Agdangan, officially the Municipality of Agdangan,  is a 5th class municipality in the province of Quezon, Philippines. According to the 2020 census, it has a population of 12,764 people.

History
In the 18th century till early 19th Century Spanish Colonial era, the Atimonan was suffering from frequent attacks by Pirates and outlaws. A man from this place named Mariano Aguilar thought of moving to a safer place to live and dwell with his family. He asked a good friend and distant relative, Juan Salvador to help him find a nearby peaceful place to settle for good. Along with their immediate families, they walked through the forest south-west bound until they found a clean river. While traversing the riverside, they found a scenic body of water which was best described as ladder-like as the waters run over ladder-like steps. They initially named the place Hagdan-hagdan (ladder-like structure). This majestic scenery nowadays is a local tourist attraction that can be found in Barangay Dayap. As they moved further west, they found a huge, serene and attractive flat land area where they later established the town proper. In this land, they built houses for their families and divided the land area between their family members, relatives and friends. The population in this newly discovered area had increased dramatically and before the end of the 19th century, this place was officially called Agdangan (from the word hagdan-hagdan, Tagalog for stairs), a barrio of the nearby town Unisan, Tayabas.

As time went by, the two families realized that there was a pressing need to build church, school buildings, marketplace, the government building and other facilities basic to the community. The Salvador family donated the site for the school buildings and the public cemetery while Aguilar family donated the sites for the Roman Catholic Church, the marketplace and the municipal building. The population had increased further as a result of influx of people from nearby municipalities and provinces adjacent to Tayabas (now Quezon province). The Philippine National Railways established a permanent train station which also contributed to the migration of people to this place. The Aguilar and Salvador families, along with other migrant families such as Garin, Banal, Mapaye, Trinidad and Urgino with the help of local civic organization led by Mr. Pedro Olase, again took proactive efforts to gain independence from Unisan. Their actions led to the foundation of the municipality of Agdangan, Province of Tayabas. The culmination of this endeavor happened on April 1, 1939, when President Manuel L. Quezon signed Executive Order No. 185, creating the municipality of Agdangan. It consisted of the barrios of Agdangan, Binagbag, Calutan, Dayap, Ibabang Kinagunau, Ilayang Kinagunan, Maligaya, and Sildura, all former parts of the town of Unisan. As of today, April 1 has been commemorated in honor of the town's foundation day and is commonly known as Agdangan Day.

In that year, President Quezon appointed Roque M. Aguilar, the eldest son of Mariano Aguilar, as Mayor until the first election was held the following year, where his youngest brother Catalino Aguilar was elected Mayor along with Crispin Salvador as Vice Mayor.

Through the years, without any lucrative source of income and industries, the modern-day Agdangan has already improved in terms of infrastructure. The local revenue has grown fairly well. The resilience, diligence, peacefulness and simplicity of people of Agdangan have been the key factors of its success.

Geography

Barangays

Agdangan is politically subdivided into 12 barangays.
 Binagbag
 Dayap
 Ibabang Kinagunan
 Ilayang Kinagunan
 Kanlurang Calutan
 Kanlurang Maligaya
 Salvacion
 Silangang Calutan
 Silangang Maligaya
 Sildora
 Poblacion I
 Poblacion II

Climate

Demographics

Economy

Government

List of former chief executive
 Roque Marasigan Aguilar
 Catalino Zatarain Aguilar
 Crispin Salvador
 Pedro Salvador Francia
 Gregorio Valle
 Norberto Monterey
 Jose Isaac Lim
 Carmelito Cabana Legaspi
 Augusto Regencia Pobeda
 Rhadam P. Aguilar
 Vicenta Aguilar
 Rhadam P. Aguilar

References

External links
Agdangan Profile at PhilAtlas.com
[ Philippine Standard Geographic Code]
Philippine Census Information

Municipalities of Quezon
Establishments by Philippine executive order